The Atena Award is an honor given by the journal Atenea, published by the University of Concepción, Chile.

The award was given for the first time in 1929, granted annually to the most outstanding book of the year in the literary or scientific field.

The Atenea was discontinued from 1967 to 1994, to be delivered again in 1994 and 1997. Re-launched in 2006, it now alternately rewards literary works and scientific books.

Recipients

References

External links
 Atenea Award at the University of Concepción

1929 establishments in Chile
Awards established in 1929
Chilean literary awards
Chilean science and technology awards
University of Concepción